Marion Spencer Fay (1898 – May  20, 1990) was a Louisiana physician, dean, teacher, and advocate. She was President and Dean of  Woman's Medical College of Pennsylvania.

Early life and education

Career and Research

Legacy 
Fay died in 1990, however her legacy lives on in the establishment of the Marion Spencer Fay Award. This award is given to a female physician who has made significant scientific strides, and who displays potential to continue doing so.

References

Pennsylvania Medical Journal. "PMJ Interview with Marion Spencer Fay, Ph.D.: Former President and Dean, Woman's Medical College," (1964 February), 25–26.

Peitzman, Steven J. A New and Untried Course: Woman’s Medical College and Medical College of Pennsylvania, 1850–1998. New Brunswick, New Jersey: Rutgers University Press, 200.

Drexel University College of Medicine. Marion Spencer Fay Award. (http://www.drexelmed.edu), accessed October 29, 2020.

Keene, Clifford H. Pioneer-Pacesetter-Innovator: The Story of the Medical College of Pennsylvania. New York: The Newcomen Society of North America, 1971.

Philadelphia Inquirer. "Marion Spencer Fay, 93," 1990 May 22.

Medical Woman's Journal. "Dean Marion Fay, Ph.D," Vol. 59, No. 7. (1952 July), 21–22, 24.

1901 deaths
Place of death missing
1816 births
Tulane University
People from Baltimore
19th-century American philanthropists